The telluride oxides or oxytellurides are double salts that contain both telluride and oxide anions (Te2− and O2−). They are in the class of mixed anion compounds.

Compounds that can be mistakenly called "telluride oxides" are tellurium dioxide and tellurite.

Some of these are under investigation as photovoltaic materials, e.g. oxygen doped zinc telluride.

Structure 
Due to the different size and chemical nature of Te2− and O2− the ions occupy different positions in the crystal structure. Some of these structures are layered.

Many of the crystal systems are tetragonal. One unusual structure has stacked tubes made from tellurium, with nested tubes of antimony oxide, which contain alkali metal.

List

References

Tellurides
Oxides